TSS Irene was a steam turbine cargo vessel operated by the London and North Western Railway from 1885 to 1906.

History
She was built by Harland and Wolff for the London and North Western Railway in 1885 and put on the Holyhead – Dublin route. She was one of a trio of ships built over 4 years for this route, all of a similar size.

Both vessels were severely damaged. Irene assisted Banshee in to Holyhead. She was disposed of in 1906.

References

1885 ships
Steamships
Ships built in Belfast
Ships of the London and North Western Railway
Ships built by Harland and Wolff
Maritime incidents in September 1889